Lieutenant General (LtGen) (Genlt) is a three-star commissioned officer rank in the Swedish Army, Swedish Air Force and Swedish Amphibious Corps. Lieutenant general ranks immediately above major general and below a general. The rank is equivalent to vice admiral in the Swedish Navy.

History
The lieutenant general was originally the general's deputy (locum tenens) or closest man. The lieutenant general was usually the commander of a division.

Historically, during the 20th century, lieutenant generals were promoted one grade upon retirement to full four-star general.

Following a proposal from the Swedish Armed Forces, the Government of Sweden decides on employment as a general of any rank.

In everyday speech, generals of all ranks are addressed as generals.

Rank insignia

Collar patches

Shoulder marks

Sleeve insignias

Amphibious Corps and Coastal Artillery

Air Force

Army

Hats

Personal flags
The command flag of a lieutenant general (and a vice admiral) is a double swallowtailed Swedish flag. In the first blue field 3 five-pointed white stars placed one over two.

See also
List of Swedish Air Force lieutenant generals
List of Swedish Army lieutenant generals after 1900
List of Swedish Navy lieutenant generals

Footnotes

References

Notes

Print

Military ranks of the Swedish Army
Military ranks of the Swedish Air Force

sv:Generallöjtnant